Strongylovouni is an Aromanian (Vlach) village and a community of the Xiromero municipality. Since the 2011 local government reform it was part of the municipality Astakos, of which it was a municipal district. The 2011 census recorded 156 residents in the village and 326 residents in the community. The community of Strongylovouni covers an area of 18.001 km2.

Administrative division
The community of Strongylovouni consists of two separate settlements: 
Manina Vlizianon (population 170)
Strongylovouni (population 156)
The aforementioned population figures are as of 2011.

History
Strongylovouni, together with the other Aromanian settlements of Aetolia-Acarnania,  was created in the midst of the 19th century, by people that fled the village of Mpitsikopoulo, in Epirus, after a string of assaults by Turkish and Albanian bandits.

See also
 List of settlements in Aetolia-Acarnania

References

Populated places in Aetolia-Acarnania
Aromanian settlements in Greece